Minor Characters: A Beat Memoir (1983) is a memoir by Joyce Johnson documenting her time with Jack Kerouac. The book also tells the story of the women of the Beat Generation, the "minor characters" of its title.

The book won a National Book Critics Circle Award.

Critical reception
Kirkus Reviews wrote that "as a montage of 1950s Village life, with Mr. and Mrs. LeRoi Jones and Franz Kline and others passing through, this is almost always evocative, frequently quite touching."

References

External links
Summary and review
Dogmatika Review

Books about the Beat Generation
1983 books
American memoirs
National Book Critics Circle Award-winning works